Harrison Sheckler (born April 23, 1996) is an American classical pianist, composer and virtual choir conductor.

Early life 
Sheckler was born in Rochester, MN and grew up in Charles City, IA, and began playing piano at age of 6 and violin at age 8. In 2014, he won the Terrace Hill Endowment for the Musical Arts Competition, broadcast on Iowa public television. He earned a Bachelor of Music degree in Piano Performance from the University of Cincinnati College-Conservatory of Music and earned a Masters of Music degree in Piano Performance from the Conservatory of Music at Brooklyn College. Sheckler is currently pursuing a Doctorate of Musical Arts degree in Piano Performance at the University of Arizona.

Career 
On Oct. 7th, 2021, Sheckler's orchestration of Jeffrey Biegel's piano piece Reflections of Justice: An Ode to Ruth Bader Ginsburg was premiered by the Dallas Symphony as part of their concert honoring the late supreme court justice Ruth Bader Ginsburg. The program also included the premiere of Ellen Taaffe Zwilich's Remembering Ruth Bader Ginsburg for voice, piano, and orchestra which featured American mezzo-soprano Denyce Graves and pianist Jeffrey Biegel.

Virtual choir 
In March 2020, Sheckler launched the Virtual Choir Project Covid-19 by asking fellow musicians and amateur singers to send him vocal recordings of the show tune “You'll Never Walk Alone",” from the 1945 Rodgers and Hammerstein musical Carousel. He thought the lyrics of the song fit the need to stay positive during the coronavirus crisis. He contacted every high school choir director in Iowa to recruit students to participate as well as friends and colleagues. He received 240 vocal submissions and 60 instrumental accompaniments from 15 countries, including Germany, Israel, South Africa, and Vietnam. Sheckler spent 200 hours combining 300 videos into one piece while making it sound like an orchestral arrangement. The recording was released on YouTube on May 1, 2020, and went viral, eventually securing more than 1.5 million views, and is one of the top 20 virtual choir recordings on the site. Online collaborations and virtual choir projects, including "You'll Never Walk Alone," have been described as part of the soundtrack of the Covid-19 pandemic.

In July 2020, Sheckler contacted former major league baseball pitcher and musician Bronson Arroyo to participate in a virtual choir recording of “Take Me Out to the Ballgame.” Current and former players, including Cy Young winner Bret Saberhagen, as well as announcers and other baseball personalities, were among the final 200 participants in the choir.

References 

1996 births
Living people
American classical pianists
University of Cincinnati – College-Conservatory of Music alumni